Hew Martin Lorimer, OBE (22 May 1907 – 1 September 1993) was a Scottish sculptor.

Early life
He was born in Edinburgh, the second son of architect Sir Robert Lorimer. He was educated at Loretto School in Musselburgh, then at Magdalen College, Oxford University, but he left Oxford prematurely to study design and sculpture under Alexander Carrick at the Edinburgh College of Art. After graduating in 1934, he entered an apprenticeship with sculptor and stonemason Eric Gill.

Sculptor

Lorimer was principally an architectural sculptor, and his profound religious beliefs had a lasting effect on his art and subject matter. After World War II, he worked on many grand sculptures, including Our Lady of the Isles, 1958, a massive granite statue of the mother and child sited at Rueval on South Uist.

Between 1950 and 1955 he also sculpted the artwork adorning the facade of the National Library of Scotland in Edinburgh, for which he produced a series of tall, allegorical figures, depicting history, law, medicine, music, poetry, science and theology. The architect of the library was Reginald Fairlie, who had been apprentice to Lorimer's father Robert. Lorimer carved the figures directly into the stone rather than copying from clay models, a practice known as direct carving. Also for Fairlie, Lorimer created a massive tympanum frieze showing St Francis returning to Assisi for The Friary in Dundee in 1959.

Crucifix on exterior east wall of St Martin and St Ninian Church, Whithorn (1959). Has suffered some damage and loss of detail after a botched cleaning job in 1987.

A statue of St Meddan in niche above the main entrance to Our Lady of the Assumption and St Meddan's Church in Troon.

The font of St Machar's Cathedral (1954).

One of Lorimer's final public commissions was the statue of Christ on the Cross for the University of Dundee Chaplaincy (1983, completed in 1986).

Honours
He was awarded an OBE in 1986 for services to architecture and conservation.

Published works

Personal life
Hew was the nephew of the Scottish painter John Henry Lorimer and the grandson of Prof. James Lorimer, lawyer and academic.
Lorimer lived in Kellie Castle in Fife, and died in a nursing home in St Andrews in 1993. He is survived by his sons, Robert and Henry, and daughter, Monica.

The castle is owned today by the National Trust for Scotland who maintain a changing exhibition of his works plus those of his father, Robert Lorimer, and his uncle, the painter John Henry Lorimer.

References

External links
 Hew Lorimer on the Gazetteer for Scotland
Hew Martin Lorimer CBE, RSA, FRBS at the Mapping Sculpture project
Our Lady & St Meddan at Explore Churches

1907 births
1993 deaths
20th-century British sculptors
Alumni of Magdalen College, Oxford
Alumni of the Edinburgh College of Art
Artists from Edinburgh
British architectural sculptors
Officers of the Order of the British Empire
People educated at Loretto School, Musselburgh
Scottish male sculptors
20th-century Scottish male artists